The 2022–23 season is the 96th season in the history of A.S. Roma and their 71st consecutive season in the top flight. The club are participating in Serie A, the Coppa Italia and the UEFA Europa League.

Players

First-team squad

Other players under contract

Out on loan

Transfers

In

Loans in

Out

Loans out

Pre-season and friendlies

Competitions

Overall record

Serie A

League table

Results summary

Results by round

Matches 
The league fixtures were announced on 24 June 2022.

Coppa Italia

UEFA Europa League

Group stage 

The draw for the group stage was held on 26 August 2022.

Knockout phase

Knockout round play-offs
The draw for the knockout round play-offs was held on 7 November 2022.

Round of 16
The draw for the round of 16 was held on 24 February 2023.

Quarter-finals
The draw for the quarter-finals was held on 17 March 2023.

Statistics

Appearances and goals

|-
! colspan=14 style="background:#B21B1C; color:#FFD700; text-align:center"| Goalkeepers

|-
! colspan=14 style="background:#B21B1C; color:#FFD700; text-align:center"| Defenders

|-
! colspan=14 style="background:#B21B1C; color:#FFD700; text-align:center"| Midfielders

|-
! colspan=14 style="background:#B21B1C; color:#FFD700; text-align:center"| Forwards

|-
! colspan=14 style="background:#B21B1C; color:#FFD700; text-align:center"| Players transferred out during the season

References

A.S. Roma seasons
Roma
Roma